In biology, an identification key, taxonomic key, or biological key is a printed or computer-aided device that aids the identification of biological entities, such as plants, animals, fossils, microorganisms, and pollen grains.  Identification keys are also used in many other scientific and technical fields to identify various kinds of entities, such as diseases, soil types, minerals, or archaeological and anthropological artifacts.

Traditionally identification keys have most commonly taken the form of single-access keys. These work by offering a fixed sequence of identification steps, each with multiple alternatives, the choice of which determines the next step.  If each step has only two alternatives, the key is said to be dichotomous, else it is polytomous.  Modern multi-access or interactive keys allow the user to freely choose the identification steps and their order.

At each step, the user must answer a question about one or more features (characters) of the entity to be identified. For example, a step in a botanical key may ask about the color of flowers, or the disposition of the leaves along the stems.  A key for insect identification may ask about the number of bristles on the rear leg.

Principles of good key design

Identification errors may have serious consequences in both pure and applied disciplines, including ecology, medical diagnosis, pest control, forensics, etc.  Therefore, identification keys must be constructed with great care in order to minimize the incidence of such errors.

Whenever possible, the character used at each identification step should be diagnostic; that is, each alternative should be common to all members of a group of entities, and unique to that group.  It should also be differential, meaning that the alternatives should separate the corresponding subgroups from each other.  However, characters which are neither differential nor diagnostic may be included to increase comprehension (especially characters that are common to the group, but not unique).

Whenever possible, redundant characters should be used at each step.  For example, if a group is to be split into two subgroups, one characterized by six black spots and the other by four brown stripes, the user should be queried about all three characters (number, shape, and color of the markings) — even though any single one of them would be sufficient in theory.  This redundancy improves the reliability of identification, provides a consistency check against user errors, and allows the user to proceed even if some of the characters could not be observed. In this case, the characters should be ordered according to their reliability and convenience. Further error tolerance can be achieved by using reticulation.

The terminology used in the identification steps should be consistent in meaning and should be uniformly used. The use of alternative terms for the same concept to achieve more "lively prose" should be avoided.  Positive statements should be used in preference to negative statements.  The wording of the alternatives should be completely parallel sentences; alternatives like "flowers red, size 10-40 cm" versus "flowers yellow" should be avoided.

Geographic distribution characters should be used with caution. Species that have not been observed in a region may still occasionally occur there. Also, the organism may have been transported, particularly to locations near ports and airports, or it may have changed its range (e. g., due to global warming). For Europe and, probably, North Africa a Palaearctic key is advisable.

Rarity is not a viable character. An identification may be correct even though a species is very rare.

Common problems in key usage

Key users must overcome many practical problems, such as:

 Variant forms: The key may identify only some forms of the species, such as adult males (or, more rarely, females). Keys for larvae identification may consider only the final instar. (This is not the case, however, of keys used in forensic identification of fly larvae.)
 Incomplete coverage: Species and groups that are difficult to identify or that have been poorly characterized may have been left out of the key, or may be mentioned only in introductory text.
 Lighting and magnification: Very few keys give details of how the specimen was viewed (the magnification, lighting system, angle of view etc.). This can cause problems. The author may, for instance refer to tiny bristles, hairs or chaetae—but how tiny?
 Language: Very few keys are multilingual. Translations of a key may be incorrect or misleading. Many keys contain vague words that do not translate..

 Obsolescence: Older keys may not include more recently described species. They may also use outdated  species names, which must then be mapped to the current ones.

Verification
The identification obtained from a key should be viewed as only a suggestion of the species's real identity. Full identification requires comparison of the specimen with some authoritative source, such as a full and accurate description of the species, preferably in a monograph.  Many keys contain brief descriptions to allow more certain identification, but these should not be assumed sufficient for verification.

Comparison with a monographic description is often difficult in practice, as many monographs are expensive, out of print, written in foreign languages, or hard to obtain. Monographs are often several decades old, so that often the species names used in the key do not match those used in the monograph.

Another alternative is comparison with authoritatively identified specimens in natural history museums or other relevant repositories.  Authoritatively identified images are becoming more common on the internet.  To qualify, the image must be labeled with a voucher specimen number, the name of the scientist who identified the photographed specimen, and the name of the public institution where the specimen is housed (so that interested parties can re-examine the specimen themselves).

See also 
 Species complex
 Systematics

References

External links 

Visual, touch, and translatable generic identification to grasses of Louisiana 2013 V3 with HTML 5
Linnaeus II - Interactive identification and descriptive data management software
Xper3 - Online interactive identification and Collaborative edition tool
Xper2 - Interactive identification and descriptive data management software
Identification key webservice
Principles of interactive keys 
Programs for interactive identification and information retrieval 
Lucid - Interactive Identification and Diagnostics key software
BioBASE for Windows 7.0 - Computer-aided identification of Bacteria
Discover Life - Interactive Guides and free online guide development space
Bioimages Comments on Royal Entomological Society of London Keys
Dmitriev Interactive keys
DKey - editor of dichotomous taxonomic keys

Wild animals identification
Plant taxonomy
Taxonomy (biology)